A hexagram is a star made of two superimposed equilateral triangles.

Hexagram may also refer to:
Hexagram (currency), a large silver coin of the Byzantine Empire
Hexagram (I Ching), the sets of 6 solid or broken lines used in the I Ching
"Hexagram" (song), a song by Deftones
Star of David, a Jewish symbol
Seal of Solomon, a magic object or symbol
Shatkona, a symbol used in Hindu yantra
 A (pre-printed or hand stamped) symbol used by the Dead Letter Office on an envelope to indicate valuable contents
Centered-hexagram, a figurate, 6-pointed 'Star' number

See also
 Unicursal hexagram, a six-pointed star that can be drawn as one complete symbol
 Hexagon (disambiguation)